Douglaston Hill Historic District is a national historic district in Douglaston, Queens, New York.  It includes 83 contributing buildings and two contributing sites.  The buildings include Zion Episcopal Church (1830), houses and garages, and commercial buildings.  The sites are Zion cemetery and public park.  It was laid out with very large lots in 1853, at the very beginning of a movement in the United States to create suburban gardens. The buildings include a number of fine examples of late-19th- and early 20th-century architectural styles such as Queen Anne, Shingle Style, and Colonial Revival.  The majority of the buildings date between 1890 and 1940.

It was listed on the National Register of Historic Places in 2000.  The area was recognized as a New York City designated landmark district in December 2004 by the New York City Landmarks Preservation Commission.

In 2012, some numbered streets in the historic district were renamed to their original names, with 43rd Avenue becoming Pine Street.

Gallery

References

Historic districts in Queens, New York
Queen Anne architecture in New York City
Shingle Style architecture in New York City
Douglaston–Little Neck, Queens
1853 establishments in New York (state)
Historic districts on the National Register of Historic Places in Queens, New York
New York City designated historic districts
New York City Designated Landmarks in Queens, New York